Hưng Nguyên is a township and capital of Hưng Nguyên District, Nghệ An Province, Vietnam.

References

Populated places in Nghệ An province
District capitals in Vietnam
Townships in Vietnam